Keoma is a 1976 Italian Spaghetti Western film directed by Enzo G. Castellari and starring Franco Nero. It is frequently regarded as one of the better 'twilight' Spaghetti Westerns, being one of the last films of its genre, and is known for its incorporation of newer cinematic techniques of the time (such as slow motion and close/medium panning shots) and its vocal soundtrack by Guido & Maurizio De Angelis.

Plot
After the American Civil War, ex-Union soldier Keoma Shannon, part-Indian and part-white, returns to his home town to find his half-brothers in alliance with a petty tyrant named Caldwell. Caldwell and his gang rule over the town with an iron fist. With the help of his father and George, an old Black friend, he vows revenge. Keoma also shows compassion when he saves a pregnant woman from a group sent by Caldwell's group to be quarantined in a mine camp full of plague victims. Keoma is constantly visited by the apparition of an older woman ("The Witch") who saved him during the massacre of an Indian camp.

Cast

Franco Nero as Keoma Shannon
William Berger as William H. Shannon
Olga Karlatos as Liza Farrow
Woody Strode as George
Orso Maria Guerrini as Butch Shannon
Gabriella Giacobbe as The Witch
Antonio Marsina as Lenny Shannon
John Loffredo as Sam Shannon 
Donald O'Brian as Caldwell
Leon Lenoir as León Lenoir, The Doctor 
Wolfango Soldati as Wolf, Confederate Soldier
Victoria Zinny as Brothel Owner
Riccardo Pizzuti as Caldwell Gang Member #1
Alfio Caltabiano as Caldwell Gang Member #2

Production
While participating in the filming of 21 Hours at Munich, Franco Nero was approached by his longtime friend and collaborator Enzo G. Castellari and producer Manolo Bolognini on the proposition of appearing in a Spaghetti Western, despite dwindling demand for films of that genre. At the time, no stories or scripts had been written - Nero, Castellari and Bolognini did, however, decide to name their pet project Keoma, which was a Native American name that, according to Bolognini, meant 'freedom' (in reality, the name means 'far away').

Keoma was reportedly planned as a sequel to Sergio Corbucci's Django, which Bolognini co-produced. The original treatment was written by actor George Eastman (Luigi Montefiori) and developed into a script by Mino Roli and Nico Ducci, neither of whom were experienced writers of Spaghetti Westerns. Roli and Ducci's screenplay arrived three days after shooting began and was quickly thrown out by Castellari and Nero, unanimously believing that it was not appropriate for a Western. Castellari proceeded to rewrite the script on a daily basis throughout filming, taking suggestions from cast and crew members, as well as being influenced by the works of Shakespeare and Sam Peckinpah, among other sources. Most of the dialogue as it appears in the film was written by actor John Loffredo, although Nero also contributed a substantial amount of his own lines, including his final exchange with "The Witch". In a 2012 interview, Nero explained that he lifted a line from a book called The Cowboy and the Cossack, by Nero's friend Claire Huffaker, for the scene with the Witch.

The film was shot over a period of eight weeks, with most principal photography being done at the Elios Studios in Rome, where Corbucci had previously filmed Django. The studio's set was in dire need of repair, which made it easier for Castellari to film as they did not have to redress the sets. The film was also shot on location at Lago di Camposecco.

According to Nero, the music by Guido & Maurizio De Angelis was inspired by Leonard Cohen.

Release
Keoma premièred in Italy on November 25, 1976, and was considered a mild success in Italy at the time. The film grossed a total of 1,571,995,000 Italian lira in Italy on its theatrical release.

It was later released on Blu-ray by Mill Creek Entertainment as a double-feature with The Grand Duel utilizing a restored print.

Some countries promoted the film as a Django film. These included France (Django Rides Again) and West Germany (Django's Great Return). In the UK, the film was released in 1977 by Intercontinental Films as The Violent Breed, while Vadib Productions released the film in the United States as Keoma the Avenger in 1978. Spanish promotion for the film lists Sergio Leone as a producer which he is not credited with anywhere else.

Reception
In a contemporary review, the Monthly Film Bulletin reviewed a dubbed 85 minute version of the film. The review noted that the film was "too severely cut to follow its plot easily let alone its multiple Freudian undercurrents", but stated that "visually it has many impressive if conventional aspects", noting the introduction and various flash back scenes. The review also praised Franco Nero as "endlessly enjoyable" and concluded that Keoma "is an effective reminder that the Italian Western was always formally more intriguing than its critics would have one believe."

In a retrospective review, AllMovie gave the film four stars out of five, and referred to the film as one of the "finest efforts" of the Spaghetti Western genre. The review noted that the "plentiful gunplay is choreographed with balletic grandeur, the camera work is sweeping and lyrical" and Luigi Montefiore's script "is heavy with spiritual metaphor while still adhering to established Western tenets." AllMovie also commented on the score as "the film's sole drawback", finding it "often tone-deaf".

See also    
 List of Italian films of 1976

Footnotes

References

External links 
 

1976 films
Spaghetti Western films
Films directed by Enzo G. Castellari
1976 Western (genre) films
Films scored by Guido & Maurizio De Angelis
Films about dysfunctional families
Italian films about revenge
Italian vigilante films
1970s vigilante films
1970s exploitation films
1970s Italian films